Cryptoblepharus caudatus is a species of lizard in the family Scincidae. It is endemic to Juan de Nova Island in Mozambique.

References

Cryptoblepharus
Reptiles described in 1918
Reptiles of Mozambique
Endemic fauna of Mozambique
Taxa named by Richard Sternfeld